Far from the Lies is the second full-length album by Greeley Estates, released on June 6, 2006, through Record Collection.

The album is the last to feature Greeley Estates' emo/post-hardcore sound before the band moved to metalcore on the next album Go West Young Man, Let the Evil Go East. The sound on Far From the Lies was described as having "songs that float between choruses, using a dash of post-hardcore here, a pinch of screamo there, and a warm helping of some modern rock."

Track listing

Personnel
Greeley Estates
Brandon Hackenson - lead guitar
Ryan Zimmerman - lead vocals 
Josh Applebach - bass guitar
Brian Champ - drums
Dallas Smith - rhythm guitar 
Production
Produced by Lou Giordano

References

2006 albums
Greeley Estates albums